This is a list of the Cambridge University crews who have competed in The Boat Race since its inception in 1829.

Rowers are listed left to right in boat position from bow to stroke. The number following the rower indicates the rower's weight in stones and pounds.



1829–1854

1856–1877

1878–1899

1900–1914

1920–1939

1940–1945 unofficial wartime races

1946–1970

1971–1999

2000 onwards

 *Denotes President

See also
List of Oxford University Boat Race crews
Grand Challenge Cup
theboatraces.org

References

The Oxford and Cambridge Boat Race
British Rowing Almanack – from 1861

William Fisher MacMichael, The Oxford and Cambridge Boat Races: From A.D. 1829 to 1869, Publisher: Deighton, 1870, 380 pages

Lists of rowers
History of rowing
 
Boat Race, Cambridge University crews
Boat Race, Cambridge University crews
Boat Race crews